The 1990 Australian federal election was held in Australia on 24 March 1990. All 148 seats in the House of Representatives and 40 seats in the 76-member Senate were up for election. The incumbent Australian Labor Party led by Bob Hawke defeated the opposition Liberal Party of Australia led by Andrew Peacock with coalition partner the National Party of Australia led by Charles Blunt despite losing the nationwide popular and two-party-preferred vote. The election saw the reelection of a Hawke government, the fourth successive term.

This was the first, and to date only, time the Labor party won a fourth consecutive election. As of 2021, this is the most recent federal election in which both leaders of the two largest parties represented divisions outside New South Wales.



Background
John Howard lost the 1987 election to Hawke, and Andrew Peacock was elected Deputy Leader in a show of party unity. In May 1989 Peacock's supporters mounted a party room coup which returned Peacock to the leadership. Hawke's Treasurer, Keating, ridiculed him by asking: "Can the soufflé rise twice?" and calling him "all feathers and no meat". Hawke's government was in political trouble, with high interest rates and a financial crisis in Victoria.

The controversy over the Multifunction Polis boiled over during the federal election campaign. Peacock, declared that a future Coalition Government would abandon the project. Peacock shared the Asian "enclave" fears of RSL president Alf Garland and others. The following day, The Australian newspaper ran a headline "Peacock a 'danger in the Lodge.

Results

House of Representatives results

Senate results

Seats changing hands

Members listed in italics did not contest their seat at this election. Where redistributions occurred, the pre-1990 margin represents the redistributed margin.

Notes

 Adelaide, SA, won by Labor at the previous election, was won by Liberal in a by-election. The margin listed above is the by-election margin.
 Deakin, Vic, won by Liberal at the previous election, was made notionally Labor in the redistribution and is considered a Liberal gain.
 Isaacs, Vic and Moore, WA, won by Labor at the previous election, were made notionally Liberal in the redistribution and are considered Liberal retains.
 Henty, Vic and Streeton, Vic, won by Labor at the previous election, were abolished.

Outcome

The 1990 election resulted in a modest swing to the opposition Coalition. Though Labor had to contend with the late 80s/early 90s recession, they won a record fourth successive election and a record 10 years in government with Bob Hawke as leader, a level of political success not previously seen by federal Labor. The election was to be Hawke's last as Prime Minister and Labor leader, he was replaced by Paul Keating on 20 December 1991 who would go on to lead Labor to win a record fifth successive election and a record 13 years (to the day) in government resulting from the 1993 election.

At the election, the Coalition won a slim majority of the two-party vote, and slashed Labor's majority from 24 seats to nine, most of the gains made in Victoria. However, it only managed a two-party swing of 0.9 percent, which was not nearly enough to deliver the additional seven seats the Coalition needed to make Peacock Prime Minister.  Despite having regained much of what the non-Labor forces had lost three years earlier, Peacock was forced to resign after the election.

This election saw the peak of the Australian Democrats' popularity under Janine Haines, and a WA Greens candidate won a seat in the Australian Senate for the first time – although the successful candidate, Jo Vallentine, was already a two-term senator, having previously won a seat for the Nuclear Disarmament Party at the 1984 election, and the Vallentine Peace Group at the 1987 election. Until 2010, this was the only post-war election where a third party (excluding splinter state parties and the Nationals) has won more than 10% of the primary vote for elections to the Australian House of Representatives.

Since the 1918 Swan by-election which Labor unexpectedly won with the largest primary vote, a predecessor of the Liberals, the Nationalist Party of Australia, changed the lower house voting system from first-past-the-post to full-preference preferential voting as of the subsequent 1919 election which has remained in place since, allowing the Coalition parties to safely contest the same seats. Full-preference preferential voting re-elected the Hawke government, the first time in federal history that Labor had obtained a net benefit from preferential voting.

It also saw the Nationals' leader, Charles Blunt, defeated in his own seat of Richmond by Labor challenger Neville Newell—only the second time that a major party leader had lost his own seat.  Newell benefited from the presence of independent and anti-nuclear activist Helen Caldicott.  Her preferences flowed overwhelmingly to Newell on the third count, allowing Newell to win despite having been second on the primary vote.

See also
 Candidates of the Australian federal election, 1990
 Members of the Australian House of Representatives, 1990–1993
 Members of the Australian Senate, 1990–1993

Notes

References

University of WA  election results in Australia since 1890
AEC 2PP vote
AustralianPolitics.com election details

External links
'Give a Damn: Vote Democrat 1' – 1990 commercial with Janine Haines

1990 elections in Australia
Federal elections in Australia
Bob Hawke
March 1990 events in Australia